Umm Heitan is an ethnic group in South Kurdufan in Sudan. They speak Koalib, a Niger–Congo language. The population of this group likely is 22,000. They are a Muslim people.

External links 
 "Umm Heitan of Sudan" at the Joshua Project

References
Joshua Project

Nuba peoples
Ethnic groups in Sudan